The 946 eruption of Paektu Mountain in Korea and China, also known as the Millennium Eruption or Tianchi eruption, was one of the most powerful volcanic eruptions in recorded history and is classified as a VEI-6 event. The eruption resulted in a brief period of significant climate change in Manchuria. The year of the eruption is in late 946 CE.

The eruption began with a strong Plinian column, and ended with voluminous pyroclastic flows. This ash layer has been named the "Baegdusan-Tomakomai ash" (B-Tm). This was one of the largest and most violent eruptions in the last 5,000 years, along with the Minoan eruption of Thera, the Hatepe eruption of Lake Taupo (around 230 AD), the 1257 eruption of Mount Samalas near Mount Rinjani, and the 1815 eruption of Mount Tambora.

Age 
The eruption ash layer is invaluable marker horizon for dating and correlating regional to global sedimentary archives, as evidence of the eruption is found throughout the Sea of Japan. Therefore, the timing of this eruption was one of the most intensely studied subject in the volcanology of Paektu Mountain, before its final settlement in the late 946 CE.

Radiocarbon dating 
The Millennium Eruption have been wiggle-match dated many times. This is made possible by the large amount of carbonized wood in the pumice around Paektu volcano. The dates determined mostly concentrate in the early- to mid-10th century, with various results being 945–984 CE, 930–943 CE, 945–960 CE, 923–939 CE, 940–952 CE, and 926–962 CE. A review of dates in literature in 2014 determined that the eruption mostly likely occurred in between 938–946 CE. Some of the discrepancies and incompatibilities between these published dates were attributed to old carbon contamination, and correction for contamination yielded radiocarbon dates closer to 946 CE.

Historical records 
Several meteorological phenomena recorded in ancient Korea and Japan during the mid-10th century may have been caused by the Millennium Eruption.

That year the sky rumbled and cried out, there was an amnesty.Kaesŏng is approximately 470 km from Paektu volcano, a distance over which the Millennium Eruption may have been heard. In addition, the Heungboksa Temple History (Annals of Kōfukuji) recorded a particularly interesting observation in Nara, Japan:On 3 November 946 CE, evening, white ash fell gently like snow.The "white ash" may have been the white, comenditic, B-Tm ash fall. Three months later, the Dai Nihon Kokiroku (Old Diaries of Japan) and Nihon Kiryaku (Japan Chronicle) both documented a loud disturbance on the same day:On 7 February 947 CE, there was a sound in the sky, like thunder.

Ice-core and tree-ring 
Ice core chronology and tree ring dating allows extremely precise dating to the exact calendar year of any ice depth in the Common Era or any tree ring with virtually no age uncertainty. Rhyolitic and trachytic volcanic glass shards with chemical fingerprints of that of Millennium magma were found at an ice depth dated precisely to 946–947 CE, effectively confirming that the eruption year within the last 3 months of 946 CE. Further confirmation came from studies of tree rings from a subfossil larch engulfed and killed during the initial explosive eruption. The tree was alive and recorded the atmospheric chemical change during the major 774 CE carbon-14 spike, and, between this event and the outermost ring (i.e. last moment the tree was alive), there are exactly 172 rings, implying that the tree was killed in 946 CE and providing an unambiguous date for the Millennium Eruption.

Eruption volume 
The total bulk volume of the eruption was previously estimated as >. A 2021 review of published deposit thickness data revealed that previous estimates overestimated either the thickness at various outcrops or the areas enclosed in isopach maps. This large uncertainty is due to limited sample sites in the territory of North Korea and the difficulty of differentiating phases of tephra for the distal B-Tm ash. However, the new estimate suffices to revise the Millennium Eruption from VEI 7 to VEI 6.

Eruption dynamics 
Extensive studies of the sedimentary record of the Millennium Eruption revealed that the eruption has two phases, both generating widespread tephra fallout and pyroclastic flows. The first phase began with a plinian eruption that produced widely dispersed comenditic tephra followed by unwelded pyroclastic flows and surges. After a hiatus of unknown duration, the second phase produced trachytic and comenditic agglutinates, multiple tephra layers, and welded pyroclastic flow and surge deposits.

Phase 1 
These pyroclastic flows were generated by the collapse of the prior plinian eruption column. A co-ignimbrite ash layer, generated from elutriation during pyroclastic flow, overlies the pyroclastic flows, representing the topmost deposition from this eruption phase. The magma composition of this phase was predominantly comenditic and of distinct light grey colour. The mass eruption rate of the Millennium Eruption has been estimated to be 1–3 × 108 kg/s during this phase but it relied on assumptions that can be updated and need to be re-estimated in future work. Based on the historical records of falling white ash in Nara, it is suggested that the first phase may have started on 2 November 946 CE.

Phase 2 
There are still disputes over what pyroclastic products were emplaced during the second phase, and whether there was a long period of quiescence between the first and the second phase. At multiple locations, non-pyroclastic materials or erosion separates the first and second phase eruptive products, indicating an eruption hiatus. However, the duration of the hiatus is a subject for further study.

Unlike the first phase, this phase began with pulsing eruptions from non-sustained columns characterized by frequent column collapses, depositing multiple tephra fall units of alternating colour and interbedded with co-occurring pyroclastic flows from column collapsing. As many as seven fall units are recognized in this phase. Fallout were also deposited as high-temperature agglutinates mantling the inner caldera wall. The uppermost part of the second phase deposits is also a co-ignimbrite ash layer. The initial pulses of the second phase erupted trachytic magma, and later pulses erupted a mix of comenditic and trachytic magma. It has been suggested that the date of second phase is 7 February 947 CE, three months after the beginning of the first phase, based on historical records. However, the depositional hiatus at multiple locations requires a time much longer than three months to form.

Volatiles 
Plinian volcanic eruptions can inject a large amount of volatiles and aerosols into the atmosphere, leading to climate and environment changes. Chlorine concentrations in the peralkaline from the Millennium Eruption were postulated to have reached up to 2% and an average of 0.44%. The Millennium Eruption was thus thought to have emitted an enormous mass of volatiles into the stratosphere, potentially resulting in a major climatic impact.

Chlorine 
McCurry used an electron microprobe to analyze the volatile in glass inclusion of feldspar. McCurry concluded that Millennium Eruption may have released 2000 Mt Cl. Liu used chromatography to analyze the average of volatile of 5 whole-rock samples, and the contents of halogen is 0.08%–0.11%. A more recent and more detailed study by Horn and Schmincke (2000) used an ion probe to analyze the average of volatile in 6 of matrix glass and 19 melt inclusions, and the average of content of Cl in melt inclusions and matrix glass were found to be 0.4762% and 0.3853%, respectively. Horn and Schmincke concluded that the Millennium Eruption may have released 45 ± 10 Mt of Cl. Another author, Guo, who studies petrology and geochemistry, shows the average of contents of Cl in melt inclusions and matrix glass to be 0.45% and 0.33%, respectively. They concluded that Millennium Eruption may have released 109.88 Mt of Cl, and 15.82 into the stratosphere. The Cl contents in the melt inclusions are similar to those of Mayor Island, and higher than those of Tambora (0.211%), Krakatau (0.238%) and Pinatubo (0.88–0.106%). The large difference of results between Guo and Horn is because Guo used higher volume and density of magma.

Sulfur dioxide 
Liu used chromatography to analyze the average of volatile content of five pumice and obsidian samples, finding the contents of sulfur to be 0.0415%, and Liu assumed the degassing efficiency factor of sulfur is 0.3. Liu estimated that the Millennium Eruption may released 40 Mt of sulfur dioxide. However, Horn and Schimincke calculated that only 20% of the sulfur in the magma had been degassed, because 80% of all analyses of inclusions and matrix fall below the detection limit of an ion probe. The results of average contents of sulfur in 19 of inclusions are 0.0455%, Horn assumed the contents of sulfur in matrix glass are 0.025% because 250 ppm is detection limit of the ion probe. They concluded that the total sulfur dioxide released from eruption was only 4 ± 1.2 Mt, but Horn suggests that may be excess sulfur accumulated in the vapor phase. Guo calculated the average contents of sulfur in nine glass inclusions and one matrix glass are 0.03% and 0.017%, respectively. The results of Guo are 23.14 Mt of sulfur dioxide released from eruption, and 3.33 Mt of sulfur dioxide input to stratosphere. The sulfur contents in glass inclusions show the reverse correlation with SiO2 concentrations, indicating that sulfur solubility in magma is controlled by magma differentiation process because of the occurrence of the S-rich fluid inclusions.

Fluorine 
Liu used chromatography to analyze the average of volatiles of five pumice and obsidian samples, finding the fluorine content to be 0.0158–0.0481%.

Horn and Schimincke used an ion probe to find an average fluorine content in inclusions of 0.4294%, but fluorine concentrations in matrix glass show a significant bimodal distribution into fluorine-rich (0.3992% fluorine) and fluorine-poor (0.2431% fluorine). In order not to over-estimate syn-eruptive fluorine loss, they considered this bimodal distribution of fluorine for calculating the volatile difference between matrix glass and melt inclusions (4300 ppm fluorine). The volatile loss is approximately 300 ppm fluorine for melt inclusion and fluorine-rich matrix glass (64% proportion of the comenditic magma), whereas it is 1900 ppm fluorine for melt inclusion and fluorine-poor matrix glass (36% proportion of the comenditic magma). Horn concluded that 42 ± 11 Mt (million tonnes) of fluorine were released by the eruption.

Guo, based on less samples (9 inclusions and 3 matrix glass), calculated that fluorine contents in inclusions and matrix glass are 0.42% and 0.21%, respectively. Guo concluded that 196.8 Mt of fluorine were released from eruption, with 28.34 Mt of fluorine injected into the stratosphere. With magma evolving, halogen contents increase irregularly, parallel to the increase of SiO2 concentrations in glass inclusions The large difference of results between Guo and Horn is because Guo used a higher volume and density of magma, and higher difference contents between matrix glass and inclusions.

Vapor phase 
Sulfur is not strongly enriched during differentiation, in contrast to water, chlorine, and fluorine. The reason could be pre- or syn-eruptive degassing of a separate vapor phase, such as that postulated for the Pinatubo and Redoubt eruptions. The ultimate source for the excess volatile observed during the 1991 Pinatubo eruption is assumed to be sulfur-rich basaltic magmas underlying, and syn-eruptively intruded, into the overlying felsic magmas. The sulfur-rich trachytic and trachyandesitic magmas which underlay the rhyolitic magma at Changbaishan may have been a possible source for excess sulfur accumulation. If this scenario is realistic, clearcut proxies for the environmental impact of the eruption would be expected. Millennium Eruption magmas are predominantly phenocryst-poor (≤ 3 vol%) comendites plus a volumetrically minor late-stage, more phenocryst-rich (10–20 vol%) trachyte. Sizable (100–500 μm diameter) glassy but bubble-bearing melt inclusions are widespread in anorthoclase and hedenbergite phenocrysts, as well as in rarer quartz and fayalite phenocrysts. Comparing the relative enrichments of incompatible volatile and nonvolatile elements in melt inclusions along a liquid line of descent shows decreasing volatile/Zr ratios suggesting the partitioning of volatiles into a fluid phase. This suggests that current gas-yield estimates (Horn & Schminke, 2000) for the Millennium Eruption, based on the petrologic method (difference in volatiles between melt inclusions and matrix glass), could be severe underestimates.

Climate effects 
The Millennium Eruption is thought to have emitted an enormous mass of volatiles into the stratosphere, likely resulting in a major worldwide climatic impact, though more recent studies indicate that the Millennium Eruption of Mt. Paektu volcano may have been limited to regional climatic effects. However, there are some meteorological anomalies in A.D. 945–948 which may relate to the Millennium Eruption. The event is thought to have caused a volcanic winter.

See also 
 El Chichón, 1982
 1883 eruption of Krakatoa
 1815 Eruption of Mount Tambora

References 

946
10th-century natural disasters
10th century in China
10th century in Korea
Volcanoes of China
Paektu
Medieval volcanic events
Volcanic eruptions in China
Plinian eruptions
Volcanic winters